Love Me Better is a 2017 song by James Blunt.

Love Me Better may also refer to:

 "Love Me Better", song by Alex Schulz from Love Thy Brother
 "Love Me Better", song by Sharon Corr from Dream of You
 "Love Me Better", song by Trey Songz from Passion, Pain & Pleasure
 "Love Me Better", song by The Pleasers